SBI General Insurance is a general insurance company founded in 2009. It started operations in 2010 and is headquartered in Mumbai, India.

The company offers a range of general insurance products including insurance for automobile, home, personal accident, travel, energy, marine, property and casualty as well as specialized financial lines. The current MD and CEO is Kishore Kumar Poludasu and Anand Pejawar is Deputy Managing Director.

History 
SBI General Insurance was founded in 2009. It started operations in 2010, as a joint venture between State Bank of India (SBI) and Insurance Australia Group (IAG).

In September 2018, the company sold a 4 per cent stake to Axis Asset Management Company and Premji Invest for  crore.

In October 2019, IAG sold its entire stake of 26 per cent for  million ( crore). Out of this, 16.01 per cent stake was acquired by Napean Opportunities LLP (an affiliate of Premji Invest) and the remaining 9.99 per cent stake was acquired by Warburg Pincus. The same year, the company partnered with PolicyBazaar to sell travel insurance to overseas travellers and announced Bancassurance tie-Up with Karnataka Gramin Bank.

Financials 
As of March 2022, SBI General’s Gross Written Premium (GWP) was Rs. 9260 crores which was a 11% growth over FY 2021-22’s GWP of Rs. 9260 crores. The company-maintained a market share of 4.15% and a solvency ratio of 1.85 during this period. SBI General also expanded its footprint and scaled up the distribution reach through bancassurance, OEM tie-ups and digital integrations.

Product and Services 
SBI General offers a range of insurance policies in many business lines. It has products for the retail segments like, health insurance, motor insurance, home insurance, travel insurance, personal accident insurance and new age products like cyber insurance. The company also has corporate products like fire insurance, marine insurance, liability insurance and property insurance. They also offer products for rural populace like crop insurance and cattle insurance.

Recognition and other activities 

SBI General has received numerous accolades for its products, services, and CSR initiatives, including the FICCI Insurance Industry Awards, awards organized by Outlook Money, Business Today – Money Today, ICC Social Impact Awards and InsureNext Awards.

Under the CSR programme, SBI General has been associating with various NGOs and programs to serve the most vulnerable communities by contributing to various areas such as health, road safety, sanitation, education, sustainability and livelihoods.

See also 

 SBI Capital Markets
 SBI Cards

References

External links
  

State Bank of India
Financial services companies based in Mumbai
Financial services companies established in 2009
General insurance companies of India
Warburg Pincus companies
Indian companies established in 2009
2009 establishments in Maharashtra